Boon Wei Ying (Chinese: 文炜楹; born 29 January 1995) is a Malaysian deaf badminton player. She won one gold, silver and bronze medal in 2021 Summer Deaflympics in badminton and silver medal in 2017 Summer Deaflympics. She also first Malaysian Deaflympic get a gold medal after 21-year Deaflympics gold drought.

Personal life 
Her brother, Boon Xin Yuan is also a badminton player.

References

External links 
Boon Wei Ying- Deaflympics profile 
 

1995 births
Living people
People from Malacca
Malaysian sportspeople of Chinese descent
Deaf badminton players
Badminton players at the 2017 Summer Deaflympics
Badminton players at the 2021 Summer Deaflympics
Medalists at the 2017 Summer Deaflympics
Medalists at the 2021 Summer Deaflympics
Malaysian female badminton players
21st-century Malaysian women